W:/2016Album/ (stylized as W:/2016ALBUM/; pronounced "double-u drive twenty sixteen album") is the eighth studio album by Canadian electronic music producer Deadmau5. The album was released on December 2, 2016, through Deadmau5 (Joel Zimmerman)'s independent record label Mau5trap. The album's title, which was suggested by fans on Twitch, refers to a computer directory on Zimmerman's network-attached storage server used to store the master tracks of the songs on the album. The album features several tracks Zimmerman uploaded to his SoundCloud account, prior to it being compromised. W:/2016Album/ is also his first studio album to be released exclusively by Mau5trap. Two singles from the album have been released: "Snowcone" and "Let Go" (featuring Grabbitz).

Background
Deadmau5 first announced the album's release during an interview with Pete Tong of BBC Radio 1 on 7 November 2016. Zimmerman stated that the album would have "an 80's sci-fi fantasy vibe," which he credits to his purchase of a Prophet-10 synthesizer. Shortly afterwards, the album's track list was leaked on Reddit, based on one that appeared briefly during a Twitch stream made by Zimmerman a month before.

Zimmerman eventually revealed that he was not satisfied with the album, stating that he felt it was "slapped together". He had previously hinted that he was already working on his next album. In an interview with Rolling Stone, Zimmerman said he was dissatisfied with the album because "it's not written from start to finish; it's over a year's worth of work that doesn't correlate".

Critical reception

Upon release, W:/2016Album/ received mixed reviews from critics. At Metacritic, which assigns a normalized rating out of 100 to reviews from mainstream publications, the album received an average score of 63, indicating "generally favourable reviews", based on 8 reviews. The Guardian gave the album a mostly positive review, stating: "This might be far from a perfect album, but it's certainly nothing to be ashamed of". Rolling Stone gave a mostly positive review as well saying: "Fist-pumpy EDM cheese this most certainly is not. Instead, W:/2016Album/ works equally in a field, car or headphones, the latest catalog entry from an artist who continues to delight in bucking expectations". Clash also gave a positive review, saying: "An album free from the shackles of a major label and its consequential rampant commercialism was always going to produce something that didn't immediately pander to its keg fuelled audience. The surprise is just how well deadmau5 pulls it off. If he actually makes a record he likes – it could be ground-breaking."

The Irish Times gave it a mostly negative review, stating: "The problem is that Zimmerman obviously didn't care too much about the final outcome to bother his hoop on the spit and polish process. Maybe W:/2017Album/ will be better", scoring it 2/5 stars. Jon Falcone from Drowned in Sound gave it an overwhelmingly negative review, noting that "nothing goes anywhere, and yet every song is so long. It's painful" awarding it only 1/10.

Track listing 

Notes
All copies of the vinyl format replace the standard version of "Let Go" with the extended version, although it's not listed as such on the back cover.

Charts

Release history

References

External links
 deadmau5 - W:/2016ALBUM/minimix

2016 albums
Deadmau5 albums
Mau5trap albums